Hampton Roads Piranhas was an American women's soccer team, founded in 1995. The team was a member of the United Soccer Leagues W-League, the second tier of women's soccer in the United States and Canada. The team played in the Atlantic Division of the Eastern Conference against the Atlanta Silverbacks Women,  Charlotte Lady Eagles, Dayton Dutch Lions FC, Fredericksburg Impact, Northern Virginia Majestics.

The team played its home games at the Virginia Beach Sportsplex in the city of Virginia Beach, Virginia. The team's colors are red and white.

The team was a sister organization of the men's Hampton Roads Piranhas team, which played in the USL Premier Development League.

The team announced on January 15, 2014 that both the PDL and W-League teams will be folding and will not play in the 2014 season. The primary owners health was cited as the reason behind the decision.

Players

2009 Roster

Notable former players
  Daniela
  Kelly Golebiowski
  Angela Hucles
  Lori Lindsey
  Sandy McQuerry
  Carrie Proost
  Amy Taylor
  Christie Welsh
  Kalin Rosales
  Mercy Akide
  Florence Omagbemi

Year-by-year

Honors
 USL W-League Atlantic Division Champions 2004
 USL W-League Atlantic Division Champions 2003

Coaches
 Joanie Murphy (1995)
 Patrick McStay (1996-1998)
 Terry Kelly and  Sandy McQuerry (1999)
 Ken Johnson (soccer) (2000)
 John Germanos (2001–2003)
 Jeffrey Bowers (2004–2005)
 Anthony Nweke (2006–2007)
 Wendy Kotwas Waddell (2008–present)

Stadia
Lake Taylor High School Stadium 1995-1997
Great Neck Middle School Stadium 1998–1999
Frank W. Cox High School Stadium 1995, 1999
Virginia Beach Sportsplex 2000–2002, 2006
Landstown High School Stadium 2003
The Trinder Center/Foster Field at Virginia Wesleyan College 2004–2005, 2008

Average attendance
1995: 572
1996: 502
1997: 532
1998: 617
1999: 955
2000: 835
2001: 793
2002: 841
2003: 698
2004: 705
2005: 1,023
2006: 
All-Time:

See also
Hampton Roads Piranhas (PDL)

References

External links
   Hampton Roads Piranhas website
  Hampton Roads Piranhas on USL Soccer

   

Sports in Virginia Beach, Virginia
Women's soccer clubs in the United States
Soccer clubs in Virginia
USL W-League (1995–2015) teams
1995 establishments in Virginia
2014 disestablishments in Virginia
Association football clubs established in 1995
Association football clubs disestablished in 2014
Women's sports in Virginia